Sanil Shahi is a Nepali  professional boxer. He represented Nepal and won a Gold Medal at 2019 South Asian Games held in Nepal. He also represented Nepal Police Club.

References

Living people
Year of birth missing (living people)
South Asian Games gold medalists for Nepal
Boxers (sport)